Euglenozoa are a large group of flagellate Discoba. They include a variety of common free-living species, as well as a few important parasites, some of which infect humans. Euglenozoa are represented by three major clades, i.e., Kinetoplastea, Diplonema (excavate) and Symbiontida.

Structure 
Most euglenozoa have two flagella, which are inserted parallel to one another in an apical or subapical pocket. In some these are associated with a cytostome or mouth, used to ingest bacteria or other small organisms. This is supported by one of three sets of microtubules that arise from the flagellar bases; the other two support the dorsal and ventral surfaces of the cell.

Some other euglenozoa feed through absorption, and many euglenids possess chloroplasts, the only eukaryotes outside Diaphoretickes to do so without performing kleptoplasty, and so obtain energy through photosynthesis. These chloroplasts are surrounded by three membranes and contain chlorophylls A and B, along with other pigments, so are probably derived from a captured green alga.  Reproduction occurs exclusively through cell division.  During mitosis, the nuclear membrane remains intact, and the spindle microtubules form inside of it.

The group is characterized by the ultrastructure of the flagella.  In addition to the normal supporting microtubules or axoneme, each contains a rod (called paraxonemal), which has a tubular structure in one flagellum and a latticed structure in the other.  Based on this, two smaller groups have been included here: the diplonemids and Postgaardi.

Classification
The euglenozoa are generally accepted as monophyletic. They are related to Percolozoa; the two share mitochondria with disk-shaped cristae, which only occurs in a few other groups.
Both probably belong to a larger group of eukaryotes called the Excavata. This grouping, though, has been challenged.

Phylogeny
The phylogeny based on the work of Cavalier-Smith (2016):

A consensus phylogeny following the review by Kostygov et al. (2021):

Taxonomy

Cavalier-Smith (2016/2017)

The following classification of Euglenozoa is as described by Cavalier-Smith in 2016, modified to include the new subphylum Plicomonada according to Cavalier-Smith et al (2017).

Phylum Euglenozoa Cavalier-Smith 1981 emend. Simpson 1997 [Euglenobionta]
 Subphylum Glycomonada Cavalier-Smith 2016
 Class Diplonemea Cavalier-Smith 1993 emend. Simpson 1997 [Diplosonematea; Diplonemia Cavalier-Smith 1993]
 Order Diplonemida Cavalier-Smith 1993 [Hemistasiida]
 Family Hemistasiidae Cavalier-Smith 2016 [Entomosigmaceae]

 Family Diplonemidae Cavalier-Smith 1993 [Rhynchopodaceae Skuja 1948 ex Cavalier-Smith 1993]
 Class Kinetoplastea Honigberg 1963 emend. Margulis 1974 [Kinetoplastida Honigberg 1963; Kinetoplasta Honigberg 1963 stat. nov.]

 Subclass Prokinetoplastina Vickerman 2004
 Order Prokinetoplastida Vickerman 2004
 Family Ichthyobodonidae Isaksen et al., 2007
 Subclass Metakinetoplastina Vickerman 2004
 Order Bodonida* Hollande 1952 em. Vickerman 1976, Kryov et al 1980
 Suborder Neobodonida Vickerman 2004
 Family Rhynchomonadidae Cavalier-Smith 2016
 Family Neobodonidae Cavalier-Smith 2016
 Suborder Parabodonida Vickerman 2004
 Family Parabodonidae Cavalier-Smith 2016 
 Family Cryptobiidae* Vickerman 2004
 Suborder Eubodonida Vickerman 2004
 Family Bodonidae Bütschli 1883 [Bodonaceae Lemmermann 1914; Bodoninae Bütschli 1883; Pleuromonadidae Kent 1880]
 Order Trypanosomatida Kent 1880 stat. n. Hollande, 1952 emend. Vickerman 2004
 Family Trypanosomatidae Doflein 1901
 Subphylum Plicomonada Cavalier-Smith 2017
 Infraphylum Postgaardia Cavalier-Smith 2016 stat. nov. Cavalier-Smith 2017
 Class Postgaardea Cavalier-Smith 1998 s.s. [Symbiontida Yubuki et al., 2009]
 Order Bihospitida Cavalier-Smith 2016
 Family Bihospitidae Cavalier-Smith 2016
 Order Postgaardida Cavalier-Smith 2003
 Family Calkinsiidae Cavalier-Smith 2016
 Family Postgaardidae Cavalier-Smith 2016
 Infraphylum Euglenoida Bütschli 1884 emend. Senn 1900 stat. nov. Cavalier-Smith, 2017 [Euglenophyta; Euglenida Buetschli 1884; Euglenoidina Buetschli 1884]
 Parvphylum Entosiphona Cavalier-Smith 2016 stat. nov. Cavalier-Smith 2017
 Class Entosiphonea Cavalier-Smith 2016
 Order Entosiphonida Cavalier-Smith 2016
 Family Entosiphonidae Cavalier-Smith 2016
 Parvphylum Dipilida Cavalier-Smith 2016 stat. nov. Cavalier-Smith 2017
 Superclass Rigimonada* Cavalier-Smith 2016 
 Class Stavomonadea Cavalier-Smith 2016 [Petalomonadea Cavalier-Smith 1993; Petalomonadophyceae]
 Subclass Heterostavia Cavalier-Smith 2016
 Order Heterostavida Cavalier-Smith 2016
 Family Serpenomonadidae Cavalier-Smith 2016
 Subclass Homostavia Cavalier-Smith 2016
 Order Decastavida Cavalier-Smith 2016a
 Family Decastavidae Cavalier-Smith 2016a
 Family Keelungiidae Cavalier-Smith 2016a
 Order Petalomonadida Cavalier-Smith 1993 [Sphenomonadales Leedale 1967; Sphenomonadina Leedale 1967]
 Family Sphenomonadidae Kent 1880
 Family Petalomonadidae [Petalomonadaceae Buetschli 1884; Notosolenaceae Stokes 1888; Scytomonadaceae Ritter von Stein 1878]
 Class Ploeotarea Cavalier-Smith 2016
 Order Ploeotiida Cavalier-Smith 1993
 Family Lentomonadidae Cavalier-Smith 2016
 Family Ploeotiidae Cavalier-Smith 2016
 Superclass Spirocuta Cavalier-Smith 2016
 Class Peranemea Cavalier-Smith 1993 emend. Cavalier-Smith 2016
 Subclass Acroglissia Cavalier-Smith 2016
 Order Acroglissida Cavalier-Smith 2016
 Family Teloproctidae Cavalier-Smith 2016a
 Subclass Peranemia Cavalier-Smith 2016
 Order Peranemida Bütschli 1884 stat. nov. Cavalier-Smith 1993
 Family Peranematidae [Peranemataceae Dujardin 1841; Pseudoperanemataceae Christen 1962]
 Subclass Anisonemia Cavalier-Smith 2016
 Order Anisonemida Cavalier-Smith 2016 [Heteronematales Leedale 1967]
 Family Anisonemidae Saville Kent, 1880 em. Cavalier-Smith 2016 [Heteronemidae Calkins 1926; Zygoselmidaceae Kent 188]
 Order Natomonadida Cavalier-Smith 2016
 Suborder Metanemina Cavalier-Smith 2016
 Family Neometanemidae Cavalier-Smith 2016
 Suborder Rhabdomonadina Leedale 1967 emend. Cavalier-Smith 1993 [Astasida Ehrenberg 1831; Rhabdomonadia Cavalier-Smith 1993; Rhabdomonadophyceae; Rhabdomonadales]
 Family Distigmidae Hollande, 1942
 Family Astasiidae Saville Kent, 1884 [Astasiaceae Ehrenberg orth. mut. Senn 1900; Rhabdomonadaceae Fott 1971; Menoidiaceae Buetschli 188; Menoidiidae Hollande, 1942]
 Class Euglenophyceae Schoenichen 1925 emend. Marin & Melkonian 2003 [Euglenea Bütschli 1884 emend. Busse & Preisfeld 2002; Euglenoidea Bütschli 1884; Euglenida Bütschli 1884] (Photosynthetic clade)
 Subclass Rapazia Cavalier-Smith 2016
 Order Rapazida Cavalier-Smith 2016
 Family Rapazidae Cavalier-Smith 2016
 Subclass Euglenophycidae Busse and Preisfeld, 2003
 Order Eutreptiida [Eutreptiales Leedale 1967 emend. Marin & Melkonian 2003; Eutreptiina Leedale 1967]
 Family Eutreptiaceae [Eutreptiaceae Hollande 1942]
 Order Euglenida Ritter von Stein, 1878 stat. n. Calkins, 1926 [Euglenales Engler 1898 emend. Marin & Melkonian 2003; Euglenina Buetschli 1884; Euglenomorphales Leedale 1967; Colaciales Smith 1938]
 Family Euglenamorphidae Hollande, 1952 stat. n. Cavalier-Smith 2016 [Euglenomorphaceae; Hegneriaceae Brumpt & Lavier 1924]
 Family Phacidae [Phacaceae Kim et al. 2010]
 Family Euglenidae Bütschli 1884 [Euglenaceae Dujardin 1841 emend. Kim et al. 2010; Colaciaceae Smith 1933] (Mucilaginous clade)

Kostygov et al. (2021)
Phylum Euglenozoa Cavalier-Smith 1981 emend. Simpson 1997
 Class Kinetoplastea Honigberg, 1963 emend. Vickerman, 1976
 Subclass Prokinetoplastia Vickerman, 2004 
 Order Prokinetoplastida Vickerman, 2004 
 Family Ichthyobodonidae Isaksen et al., 2007 
 Family Perkinselidae Kostygov, 2021
 Subclass Metakinetoplastia Vickerman, 2004 
 Order Eubodonida Vickerman 2004 
 Family Bodonidae Bütschli, 1883 
 Order Neobodonida Vickerman, 2004 
 Family Allobodonidae Goodwin et al., 2018 
 Family Neobodonidae Cavalier-Smith, 2016 
 Family Rhynchomonadinae Cavalier-Smith, 2016 
 Order Parabodonida Vickerman, 2004 
 Family Cryptobiidae Poche, 1911 emend. Kostygov, 2021 
 Family Trypanoplasmatidae Hartmann and Chagas, 1910 emend. Kostygov, 2021 
 Order Trypanosomatida Kent, 1880 
 Family Trypanosomatidae Doflein, 1901 
 Class Diplonemea Cavalier-Smith, 1993
 Order Diplonemida Cavalier-Smith, 1993
 Family Diplonemidae Cavalier-Smith, 1993
 Family Hemistasiidae Cavalier-Smith, 2016 
 Family Eupelagonemidae Okamoto and Keeling, 2019 
 Class Euglenida Bütschli, 1884 emend. Simpson, 1997
 Clade Olkaspira Lax and Simpson, 2020 
 Clade Spirocuta Cavalier-Smith, 2016 
 Clade Euglenophyceae Schoenichen, 1925 emend. Marin and Melkonian, 2003 
 Order Euglenales Leedale, 1967 emend. Marin and Melkonian, 2003 
 Family Euglenaceae Dujardin, 1841 emend. Kim et al., 2010 [Euglenidae Dujardin, 1841]
 Family Phacaceae Kim, Triemer and Shin 2010 [Phacidae Kim, Triemer and Shin 2010]
 Family Eutreptiaceae Hollande, 1942 [Eutreptiidae Hollande, 1942]
 Order Rapazida Cavalier-Smith, 2016 
 Family Rapazidae Cavalier-Smith, 2016 
 Clade Anisonemia Cavalier-Smith, 2016 
 Order Anisonemida Cavalier-Smith, 2016 
 Family Anisonemidae Kent, 1880
 Clade Aphagea Cavalier-Smith, 1993 emend. Busse and Preisfeld, 2002 
 Order Peranemida Cavalier-Smith, 1993 
 Clade Alistosa Lax et al., 2020 
 Order Petalomonadida Cavalier-Smith, 1993 
 Class Symbiontida Yubuki, Edgcomb, Bernhard and Leander, 2009

References

External links 
Tree of Life: Euglenozoa

 
Bikont phyla
Taxa named by Thomas Cavalier-Smith